Hanoi International American Hospital' (American Hospital in Vietnam) - an up-to-date hospital, which began to be built in Vietnam since 2007. The investment license has already been issued by the Ministry of Planning and Investment of Vietnam in 1997, although the project implementation was only on paper since that time.

The management group of facility will be run by Healthcare Corporation of America, or Ted Bowen and Associates and headed by well known gi surgeon, Dr. Michael Debakey.

Main services and facilities
The hospital will supposedly offer such services: General Medical Care, Surgery, Emergency Medicine, Pediatrics, Dentistry, Chiropractic, Psychiatry, Neurology, Gynecology, Ophthalmology, Plastic Surgery, Nuclear Medicine, Nursing Services, Otorhinolaryngology, Acupuncture, Oncology, Cardiology, Pathology.

According to the plan, it will be equipped by: Pharmacy, Radiology (X-Ray, MRI, CT), Telemedical Monitor, Blood Bank, Health Food Store, Full Laboratory Services, Satellite Clinics, Transplanting Store.

As of March 25, 2020, this hospital is abandoned.

References

Hospital buildings completed in 2007
Hospitals in Hanoi
Hospitals established in 2007
2007 establishments in Vietnam